The maritime coast range ponderosa pine forests, also known as ponderosa sand parklands and ponderosa pine sandhills, are a rare temperate forest community consisting of open stands of a disjunct population of ponderosa pine growing on sandy soils in the Santa Cruz Mountains of north central coastal California in the United States.

Description
This forest type is restricted to very sandy Zayante soils that are isolated pockets of decomposing sandstone from the Miocene terraces of the coastal range, distinct from the volcanically formed rocks which make up most of the Santa Cruz Range. These soils are deemed to be relicts of once larger expanses found when this region was geologically even younger, and hence had more evidence of the sandstone erosion of the ancient uplifted ocean floor. Estimated to originally cover , 40% of this type has been lost, mostly to sand quarrying and development.

Fire historically played an important role in this habitat.

One of these three forests is located atop a ridge that straddles the Carbonera Creek and Zayante Creek watersheds of Santa Cruz County within the western slopes of the Santa Cruz Mountains.

The forests are home to three endemic insects and four endemic plants.

See also
Ponderosa pine forest
Bonny Doon Ecological Reserve
Henry Cowell Redwoods State Park
High conservation value forest 
Endangered arthropod

References

External links
U.S. listing document for two endangered insects within maritime coast range ponderosa pine forests

Plant communities of California
Natural history of the California Coast Ranges
Geography of Santa Cruz County, California
Forests of California
Natural history of Santa Cruz County, California
Santa Cruz Mountains